Super Optimal Broth (SOB medium) is a nutrient-rich bacterial growth medium used for microbiological culture, generally of Escherichia coli. This nutrient-rich microbial broth contains peptides, amino acids, water soluble vitamins and glucose in a low-salt formulations. It was developed by Douglas Hanahan in 1983 and is an adjusted version of the commonly used LB medium (lysogeny broth). Growth of E. coli in SOB or SOC medium results in higher transformation efficiencies of plasmids.
SOC medium can also be used to regenerate Klebsiella oxytoca strains for the improved transformation efficiency.

Super Optimal broth with Catabolite repression (SOC) is SOB with added glucose.

Composition
(Figures in parentheses are the masses required to create 1 liter of medium)

SOB
 2% w/v tryptone (20 g)
 0.5% w/v Yeast extract (5 g)
 8.56mM NaCl (0.5 g) or 10mM NaCl (0.584 g)
 2.5mM KCl (0.186 g)
 ddH2O to 1000 mL
 10mM MgCl2 (anhydrous: 0.952 g; hexahydrate: 2.033 g) AND 10mM MgSO4 (anhydrous:1.204 g; heptahydrate: 2.465 g)

SOC
In addition to the SOB contents, SOC also contains 20mM glucose (3.603 g)

Alternatively, SOB and SOC can be made by adding small amounts of concentrated magnesium chloride and glucose solutions to pre-prepared SOB.

pH adjustment
For maximum effectiveness, SOB/SOC media should have its pH adjusted to 7.0 by adding concentrated sodium hydroxide. The original literature states that the pH of the final medium should be between 6.8 and 7.0.

Sterilization
Finally, the SOB medium should be autoclaved at 121 °C to ensure sterility. The components of SOC medium should not be autoclaved together because the high temperature can cause the glucose to react with tryptic peptides (see Maillard reaction), compromising the quality. SOB and magnesium and glucose additive solutions can be autoclaved separately and mixed afterwards to final concentrations. Complete SOC can be filter sterilized through a 0.22 μm filter.

References

Microbiological media
American inventions